Allocasuarina crassa, commonly known as the Cape Pillar sheoak, is a species of sheoak native to Tasmania, Australia.

Description
Its articles are 10–26 mm long and 1.2–4 mm in diameter, with densely pubescent furrows and, usually, from 6 to 9 teeth. The bark is smooth when young, becoming flaky with age. It is probably wind-pollinated.

Distribution and habitat
Endemic to Tasmania, the tree is restricted to the Cape Pillar area of the Tasman Peninsula and Tasman Island, both of which are in the Tasman National Park where there are about 100,000 mature individuals. It has a linear extent of distribution of 10 km with an area of about 20 km2.  It grows on dolerite soils in both wet eucalypt forest and in coastal heath and shrubland. On the Cape Pillar plateau it may occur in pure, even-age stands after a long fire-free period.

Status and conservation
The species is listed as rare under the Tasmanian TSP Act.  The main threat is inappropriate fire regimes.  It is also sensitive to the introduced soil-borne pathogen Phytophthora cinnamomi.

References

crassa
Fagales of Australia
Flora of Tasmania
Trees of Australia
Plants described in 1989
Tasman National Park